TPIA may refer to:

 Toronto Pearson International Airport
 Third Party ISP Access
 Take Pride in America